is an athletic stadium in Nagano Sports Park in the Yoshida area of Nagano, Nagano, Japan.

The seating capacity is 5,200 seats, and the grass stand holds 12,000 people.

External links
Info on aqua.wing.jp

AC Nagano Parceiro
Football venues in Japan
Sports venues in Nagano Prefecture
Sports venues completed in 1976
Sport in Nagano (city)
1976 establishments in Japan